Leo Haas (15 April 1901 – 13 August 1983) was a German painter, graphic artist, draughtsman and caricaturist.

Life 
Born in Troppau, Austria-Hungary, Haas studied at the Staatliche Akademie der Bildenden Künste Karlsruhe from 1919 to 1922 and then in Berlin with Emil Orlik and Willy Jaeckel. He worked from 1926 as a painter, graphic artist, press artist and caricaturist in Vienna and later in his hometown Opava in Czechoslovakia.

After the Munich Agreement, Haas, who came from a middle-class Jewish family, was imprisoned and taken to Ostrau for forced labour. In 1939, he was deported to the notorious "Juden-KZ" Nisko, the experimental camp initiated and personally supervised by Adolf Eichmann and precursor to Auschwitz. Haas was one of the 500 inmates who were then later returned to their home towns.

In late autumn 1942, he and his wife were deported to the Theresienstadt concentration camp, where he joined the Group of Painters of Theresienstadt around Bedřich Fritta from Prague. Among other things, they managed to smuggle drawings about the atrocities in Theresienstadt into neutral foreign countries. In 1944, the Gestapo officers of the concentration camp command and Adolf Eichmann accused them of this in personally conducted interrogations. The artists and their family members were taken to the cells of the Kleinen Festung and later to other concentration camps. Haas was the only painter of Theresienstadt who survived imprisonment. Immediately before being taken for interrogation, the artists managed to produce many hundreds of drawings and also to hide the picture book For Tommy on his third birthday in Theresienstadt 22.1.1944 by Bedřich Fritta for his son Tomáš. The book was published in 1985.

On 28 October 1944, Haas became prisoner no. 199 885 in Auschwitz concentration camp. There, too, he managed to draw. On 27 November 1944, Haas was transferred to the Sachsenhausen concentration camp to the Sonderkommando for Counterfeiting, together with other "specialists" and the note "return undesired". There he was charged with, among other things, forgery of British Stamps. Towards the end of the war, the prisoners of the counterfeiting squad were taken to KZ Mauthausen and later to Ebensee concentration camp together with the printing presses. There they were liberated by American troops shortly after their arrival on 6 May 1945.

After 1945, Haas lived in Prague with his wife Erna, who had also survived the Theresienstadt concentration camp, the Small Fortress Theresienstadt, Auschwitz and other concentration camps, as a press artist. In his biography, he emphasised that he had consciously chosen this path and against a "pure" artistic career as a painter because of his concentration camp experiences. His wife died in 1955 as a result of medical experiments in Auschwitz.

In the Gestapo prison Small Fortress Theresienstadt, Erna Haas took intensive care of Bedřich Fritta's three-year-old son, Tomáš. After their liberation in 1945, they adopted Tomáš Fritta. Bedřich Fritta had perished in Auschwitz in November 1944, his wife died in the Small Fortress Theresienstadt. 

From 1955, Haas lived in East Berlin, where he worked as a cartoonist for the Neues Deutschland, the Eulenspiegel and other newspapers. To the latter magazine he contributed from the first issue (1954) contributed a total of 1185 drawings until 1982. For his 70th birthday, DEFA created the documentary .

Haas died in East Berlin at the age of 82 and was buried in the artists' section of the Zentralfriedhof Friedrichsfelde.

Works

References

External links 

 
 COMPASS, Uta Fischer und Roland Wildberg: „Theresienstadt. Eine Zeitreise, Vier Künstler zeichneten die Wahrheit, Bilder des Grauens“
 A short biography of Haas, Yad Vashem website.
 Haas in an online Holocaust art exhibition, Yad Vashem website.

German caricaturists
German poster artists
Recipients of the Patriotic Order of Merit in gold
Recipients of the Banner of Labor
Nazi concentration camp survivors
Theresienstadt Ghetto survivors
Auschwitz concentration camp survivors
Sachsenhausen concentration camp survivors
1901 births
1983 deaths
People from Opava
Silesian-German people
Sudeten German people